Alexander Clive Ritson (March 7, 1922 – July 18, 2008) was a professional ice hockey centre who played in one National Hockey League game for the New York Rangers during the 1944–45 NHL season.

See also
List of players who played only one game in the NHL

External links

1922 births
2008 deaths
Canadian ice hockey centres
Cincinnati Mohawks (AHL) players
Fort Worth Rangers players
Hershey Bears players
Ice hockey people from Alberta
Louisville Blades players
New Haven Ramblers players
New York Rangers players
Omaha Knights (USHL) players
People from Northern Sunrise County
Providence Reds players
Seattle Ironmen players
Tulsa Oilers (AHA) players
Washington Lions players
Canadian expatriate ice hockey players in the United States